Kursk Governorate was an administrative division (a guberniya) of the Russian Empire, located in European Russia. It existed from 1796 to 1928; its seat was in the city of Kursk.

Administrative divisions
As of 1914, Kursk Governorate included 15 uyezds.
 Belgorodsky Uyezd
 Grayvoronsky Uyezd
 Dmitriyevsky Uyezd
 Korochansky Uyezd
 Kursky Uyezd
 Lgovsky Uyezd
 Novooskolsky Uyezd
 Oboyansky Uyezd
 Putivlsky Uyezd
 Rylsky Uyezd
 Starooskolsky Uyezd
 Sudzhansky Uyezd
 Timsky Uyezd
 Fatezhsky Uyezd
 Shchigrovsky Uyezd

 
Governorates of the Russian Empire
1796 establishments in the Russian Empire
1928 disestablishments in Russia
States and territories established in 1796
States and territories disestablished in 1928